The Women's points race at the 2011 UCI Track Cycling World Championships was held on March 23. Twenty athletes participated in the contest. The distance was 100 laps (25 km) with 10 sprints.

Results
The race started at 20:20.

References

2011 UCI Track Cycling World Championships
UCI Track Cycling World Championships – Women's points race